Oenopota pingelii is a species of sea snail, a marine gastropod mollusk in the family Mangeliidae.

Description
The length of the shell varies between 10 mm and 13 mm.

The slender shell has an elongated spire, and moderately convex whorls. It shows numerous longitudinal, rather straight ribs, excurved above, and strong, elevated spiral lines, forming nodules where they cross the ribs. Its color is pale chestnut-brown, with the siphonal canal and the columella whitish.

Distribution
This species occurs in European waters, the Northwest Atlantic Ocean (Norway, Greenland) and the Gulf of Maine.; also in the Okhotsk Sea.

References

 Møller H. O., 1842 :Index Molluscorum Groenlandiae ; Naturhistorisk Tidsskrift, Kjøbenhavn 4 (1): 76–97
 Brunel, P., L. Bosse, and G. Lamarche. 1998. Catalogue of the marine invertebrates of the estuary and Gulf of St. Lawrence. Canadian Special Publication of Fisheries and Aquatic Sciences, 126. 405 p.
 Gofas, S.; Le Renard, J.; Bouchet, P. (2001). Mollusca, in: Costello, M.J. et al. (Ed.) (2001). European register of marine species: a check-list of the marine species in Europe and a bibliography of guides to their identification. Collection Patrimoines Naturels, 50: pp. 180–213
 Trott, T.J. 2004. Cobscook Bay inventory: a historical checklist of marine invertebrates spanning 162 years. Northeastern Naturalist (Special Issue 2): 261–324

External links
  Tucker, J.K. 2004 Catalog of recent and fossil turrids (Mollusca: Gastropoda). Zootaxa 682:1–1295.

pingelii
Gastropods described in 1842